Johan Lolos is a Belgian-Greek photographer, based in Liège. He is known as lebackpacker on social media. His book Peaks of Europe (Lannoo, 2018) describes a 5-month journey around Europe's alpine regions. He has made landscape, outdoor and travel photography in New Zealand—where he spent a year traveling— Norway, Canada, Australia, Iceland and Switzerland.

Lolos' work has been published in National Geographic, GQ and Lonely Planet.

Early life and education 
Lolos was born in Liège, Belgium. He studied Public Relations at IHECS, a Journalism & Communication school in Brussels, Belgium and graduated in 2013.

Publications 
 Peaks of Europe. Lannoo, 2018. . English-language version. Also available in German (Dumont), French (Glénat) and Italian (Rizzoli) under different titles.

References 

Year of birth missing (living people)
Living people
Artists from Liège
Belgian photographers
21st-century photographers
Landscape photographers
Travel photographers
Greek photographers
lebackpacker